Anna Stylianou (born May 20, 1986) is a Cypriot swimmer, who specialized in freestyle events. Stylianou made her official debut, as a 14-year-old, at the 2000 Summer Olympics in Sydney, where she placed forty-fourth overall in the women's 100 m freestyle, with a time of 59.08 seconds.

Eight years after competing in her last Olympics, Stylianou qualified for her second Cypriot team, as a 22-year-old, at the 2008 Summer Olympics in Beijing. In the 200 m freestyle, Stylianou challenged seven other swimmers on the third heat, including freestyle relay champion Ranomi Kromowidjojo of the Netherlands. She snared the third spot and twenty-seventh overall by three hundredths of a second (0.03) Austria's Jördis Steinegger in 2:00.55. In her second event, 100 m freestyle, Stylianou finished sixth on the same heat  and thirty-sixth overall by 0.03 of a second behind Iceland's Ragnheiður Ragnarsdóttir, lowering her Olympic time to 56.38.

At the 2012 Summer Olympics in London, Stylianou qualified only for the 200 m freestyle in a B-standard entry time of 2:00.88. She challenged seven other swimmers on the second heat, including four-time Olympian Hanna-Maria Seppälä of Finland and former Olympic champion Camelia Potec of Romania. Stylianou raced to fourth place by more than half a second (0.50) behind Mexico's Liliana Ibanez, outside her entry time of 2:01.87. Stylianou failed to advance into the semifinals, as she matched her overall position from Beijing in the preliminary heats.

References

External links
NBC Olympics Profile

1986 births
Living people
Cypriot female swimmers
Olympic swimmers of Cyprus
Swimmers at the 2000 Summer Olympics
Swimmers at the 2008 Summer Olympics
Swimmers at the 2012 Summer Olympics
Cypriot female freestyle swimmers
People from Larnaca